The National Cutting Horse Association (or NCHA) is a non-profit equestrian organization headquartered in the US. Their primary purpose is to promote and sponsor cutting events. The association was founded in 1946 at the Southwestern Exposition and Fat Stock Show. The first NCHA sponsored cutting horse competition was held that same year in Dublin, Texas.

The association is headquartered in Fort Worth, Texas and has several affiliate members around the world.

Six major events
The NCHA produces six major annual events as follows:

NCHA Championship Futurity for 3-year-old horses which have never been shown in competition cutting.
NCHA Super Stakes for 4-year-old and 5-/6-year-old horses - their sires must be subscribed to the event. 
NCHA Summer Spectacular (Derby) for 4-year-old and 5-/6-year-old horses (Classic/Challenge).
NCHA World Championship Finals with both Open and Non-Pro Championship classes. Fifteen Entries are taken in both based on the annual standings in each class.
Eastern National Championships - only contestants in NCHA's affiliate or area standings are eligible to compete in the 12 approved Championship classes.
Western National Championships - only contestants in NCHA's affiliate or area standings are eligible to compete in the 12 approved Championship classes.

Hall of Fame
The NCHA offers four Halls of Fame to recognizes exceptional contributions and/or accomplishments as follows:
Horse Hall of Fame - to give greater recognition to famous cutting horses
Members Hall of Fame - to recognize the outstanding and unusual contributions to the NCHA by certain individuals over a period of time
Rider Hall of Fame - to recognize exceptional riders of cutting horses who have qualified for this honor based on their lifetime earnings  
Non-Pro Hall of Fame - to recognize exceptional non-professional riders of cutting horses who have qualified for this honor based on their lifetime earnings

Notes

In 2019, the Top 5 Equi-Sat Cutting Sires were:
One Time Pepto. LTE:($12,845,963)
Smooth As A Cat. LTE:($24,830,037)
Dual Rey. LTE:($38,897,142)
Metallic Cat. LTE:($21,644,433)
High Brow Cat. LTE:($79,279,171)

References

External links
 The NCHA web page

 
Equestrian organizations
Sports in Fort Worth, Texas
Cutting (sport)
Organizations based in Fort Worth, Texas